The 2017–18 Third Amateur Football League season is the 68th season of the Bulgarian Third Amateur Football League. The group is equivalent to the third level of the Bulgarian football pyramid with four divisions existing in it. The divisions themselves are geographically separated into North-West, North-East, South-East, and South-West, covering the football clubs of their respective zones. This is the second season after the reorganization of the Bulgarian football system, which saw the emergence of new competition formats, such as First and Second Professional Football Leagues.

Team changes

To Third League
Promoted from Regional Divisions
 Benkovski Byala
 Spartak 1918
 Botev Lukovit
 Yantra 1919 Gabrovo
 Yantra Polski Trambesh
 Sokol Markovo
 Tundzha Yagoda
 CSKA 1948
 Elin Pelin

Relegated from Second League
 CSKA Sofia II
 Spartak Pleven
 Bansko
 Levski Karlovo

From Third League
Relegated to Regional Divisions
 Spartak Varna
 Inter Dobrich
 Kom Berkovitsa
 Juventus Malchika
 Lyubimets
 Elhovo
 Velbazhd Kyustendil
 Chepinets Velingrad

Promoted to Second League
 Chernomorets Balchik
 Maritsa Plovdiv
 Litex
 Strumska Slava Radomir

a.CSKA Sofia II officially declined to participate in the South-West Third League and was dissolved.

Club movements between Third League and Second League
The champions of three Third League divisions gained promotion to the 2017–18 Second League: Chernomorets Balchik from North-East, Litex from North-West and Strumska Slava Radomir from South-West. Maritsa Plovdiv joined the promoted teams as runners-up of the South-East group because champions Zagorets refused to participate for financial reasons.
In return, four teams were relegated to the Third League: CSKA Sofia II, Spartak Pleven, Bansko and Levski Karlovo. CSKA Sofia II was dissolved; as a result, Svoboda Peshtera (16th in 2016–17 South-West Third League) was spared from relegation to regional divisions.

Club movements between Third League and the Regional Groups
 North-East: Spartak Varna and Inter Dobrich were relegated last season to regional divisions. The new teams, coming from the regional divisions, are Benkovski Byala (champions of RFG Ruse) and Spartak 1918 (runners-up of A2 RFG Varna).  On 21 June 2017, Spartak Varna merged with Spartak 1918.
 North-West: Kom Berkovitsa and Juventus Malchika were relegated from last season to regional divisions. The new teams, coming from the regional divisions, are Botev Lukovit (9th in RFG Lovech), Yantra 1919 Gabrovo (runners-up of RFG Gabrovo) and Yantra Polski Trambesh (champions of A RFG Veliko Tarnovo).
 South-East: Lyubimets and Elhovo were relegated from last season to regional divisions. The new teams, coming from the regional divisions, are Sokol Markovo (runners-up of A RFG Plovdiv) and Tundzha Yagoda (runners-up of RFG Stara Zagora).
 South-West: Velbazhd Kyustendil and Chepinets Velingrad were relegated from last season to regional divisions. The new teams, coming from the regional divisions, are CSKA 1948 (champions of RFG Sofia (capital)) and Elin Pelin (champions of RFG Sofia (province)).  Initially, Kyustendil (champions of RFG Kyustendil) was supposed to participate as winners of the promotion play-off. However, on 14 July 2017, Kyustendil withdrew from participation so the Bulgarian Football Union scheduled an additional play-off between the losers of the promotion play-offs. On 31 July, Bratsigovo refused participation so Elin Pelin was approved as new member of the South-West league.

Northeast group

Stadia and locations

League table

Southeast group

Stadia and locations

League table

Northwest group

Stadia and locations

League table

Southwest group

Stadia and locations

League table

References

Third Amateur Football League (Bulgaria) seasons
3
Bulgaria